Stubbs Cross is a hamlet in the civil parish of Kingsnorth near Ashford in Kent, England. The area runs from a cross road at Ashford Road that leads to Hamstreet, through to the next T Junction via Magpie Pie Hall Road, leading to but finishing at the road known as Tally Ho Road.

Magpie Hall Road (Stubb Cross) Has approximately 55-60 houses which sit either side of the road, the road is approximately 1.4 km in length with some small holdings and farmer fields each side.

External links

Villages in Kent